Dithalama punctilinea is a moth of the family Geometridae first described by Charles Swinhoe in 1902. It is found in Western Australia.

References

Moths described in 1902
Scopulini